Éléonore de Bourbon-Condé (30 April 1587 – 20 January 1619) was the daughter of Henri I de Bourbon and his second wife Charlotte Catherine de la Tremoille. Éléonore's father was the first cousin of King Henry IV of France. She was also the aunt of Anne Geneviève de Bourbon and Louis II de Bourbon, Prince de Condé.

Life 
Éléonore married Philip William, Prince of Orange, who was already 51 years old, on 23 November 1606, at the Palace of Fontainebleau.

On 25 October 1611, it was revealed that the mother of Éléonore and her sister in law Charlotte-Marguerite de Montmorency, wife of Henri II de Bourbon, would travel to The Hague. The States-General of the Netherlands decided to present the ladies with a fitting gift, partly from politeness, and partly with the view of Henri II de Bourbon-Condé as a potential future ally.

It was decided to offer tableware to the value of 12,000 guilders. The linens were bought at the initiative of the burgomaster of Haarlem, who was also member of the States-General. This was partly due to Haarlem having an international reputation in the manufacturing of quality linen. The linen damask was specially woven with flower motifs, hunting scenery, biblical representations and images from classical literature. 

When her husband died after a failed medical treatment, Éléonore did not inherit anything, since Philip William had willed all his possessions to his half-brother Maurice of Nassau, Prince of Orange. She died childless, though raised her great-niece, Louise de Bourbon.

References

External links 
 

1587 births
1619 deaths
Countesses of Nassau
House of Bourbon-Condé
Princesses of Orange
Princesses of the Blood